Sardar Mehtab Singh Grewal (born 1857) was a home minister in the court of Maharaja Hira Singh of Nabha State in the early 20th century. Mehtab is credited with introducing the Mandi system in Punjab.

References 

Year of death missing
Indian government officials
20th-century Indian politicians
Political office-holders in Punjab, India
1857 births